Piano Sonata in A major may refer to:

 Piano Sonata No. 2 (Beethoven)
 Piano Sonata No. 28 (Beethoven)
 Piano Sonata No. 1 (Hindemith)
 Easter Sonata (Fanny Mendelssohn)
 Piano Sonata No. 11 (Mozart)
 Piano Sonata No. 6 (Prokofiev)
 Piano Sonata in A major, D 664 (Schubert)
 Piano Sonata in A major, D. 959 (Schubert)